The Moben Kitchens Classic was a women's professional golf tournament on the Ladies European Tour. It was played between 1980 and 1982 at The Mere Resort in England.

Winners

References

External links
Ladies European Tour

Former Ladies European Tour events
Golf tournaments in England
Defunct sports competitions in England
Recurring sporting events established in 1980
Recurring sporting events disestablished in 1982